Stella Maris Airport  is an airport located near Stella Maris on Long Island in The Bahamas.

Facilities

The airport was designed and built by Jack Henry Cordery who was engaged by Stella Maris Estate Company in 1967 when he emigrated from England to take the job of Estate Development Manager. He died on Long Island in 1968 and is buried there.

Airlines and destinations

Historical airline service

Stella Maris Airport was served in the past by Bahamasair which operated regional turboprop airliners on nonstop flights primarily to Nassau.  According to the Official Airline Guide (OAG), in 1975 Bahamasair was serving the airport with Fairchild Hiller FH-227 aircraft which were then replaced with new Hawker Siddeley HS 748 aircraft in 1979.  By 1999, Bahamasair was operating de Havilland Canada DHC-8 Dash 8 series 300  aircraft into the airport according to the OAG.  Bahamasair no longer serves the airport but does currently serve the island's the other airfield, Deadman's Cay Airport near Clarence Town.

References

External links
 
 

Airports in the Bahamas
Long Island, Bahamas